Zajączkowo may refer to the following places:
Zajączkowo, Greater Poland Voivodeship (west-central Poland)
Zajączkowo, Kuyavian-Pomeranian Voivodeship (north-central Poland)
Zajączkowo, Podlaskie Voivodeship (north-east Poland)
Zajączkowo, Bytów County in Pomeranian Voivodeship (north Poland)
Zajączkowo, Kościerzyna County in Pomeranian Voivodeship (north Poland)
Zajączkowo, Słupsk County in Pomeranian Voivodeship (north Poland)
Zajączkowo, Tczew County in Pomeranian Voivodeship (north Poland)
Zajączkowo, Elbląg County in Warmian-Masurian Voivodeship (north Poland)
Zajączkowo, Nowe Miasto County in Warmian-Masurian Voivodeship (north Poland)
Zajączkowo, Ostróda County in Warmian-Masurian Voivodeship (north Poland)
Zajączkowo, West Pomeranian Voivodeship (north-west Poland)